Sunday Matthew Essang (born 24 December 1940) was the Finance Minister of the Federal Republic of Nigeria during the Nation's 2nd republic (1979 to 1983).

Early life and education
Essang was born on December 24, 1940, in Oron, a city in Cross-River state, Nigeria. Essang attended King's College, Lagos. He received a B.Sc Economics degree from the University of Ibadan in 1964. Essang went on to receive his Masters and Doctorate degrees from the University of Michigan, US.

Career
Essang was the Head of the Department of Economics in the University of Calabar from 1976-1979 before he was appointed into office. He was also the Dean of the Faculty of Social Sciences at the University of Calabar. Essang was appointed the Minister of Finance during the Shehu Shagari administration (1979-1983).

Publications

References

1940 births
Living people
Finance ministers of Nigeria
University of Michigan alumni
University of Ibadan alumni
People from Cross River State
Academic staff of the University of Calabar
Nigerian economists